Neurobathra is a genus of moths in the family Gracillariidae.

Species
Neurobathra bohartiella Opler, 1971
Neurobathra curcassi Busck, 1934
Neurobathra strigifinitella (Clemens, 1860)

External links
Global Taxonomic Database of Gracillariidae (Lepidoptera)

Gracillariinae
Gracillarioidea genera